Bossa Nova Stories is the nineteenth studio album by Brazilian jazz artist Eliane Elias, released on 24 June 2008 by Blue Note Records. The album is a tribute to celebrate the 50th anniversary of the bossa nova music style.

Reception
Cristophen Loudon of Jazz Times wrote, "Chronologically, she is two years younger than the bossa nova and two years older than Antonio Carlos Jobim and Vinicius de Moraes' iconic 'The Girl From Ipanema,' the song that ignited the worldwide bossa-nova craze. Musically, with her honeyed voice, dense and luxurious as the finest Aubusson carpet, her equally sumptuous appeal as a pianist and her skill for subtle, cozy arrangements, Elias seems the living, breathing extension of the oxymoronic plush minimalism that defines bossa nova."

Ken Dryden of AllMusic stated, "Eliane Elias returns to the music of her native Brazil with this collection of bossa nova favorites, though there are a few American standards and pop songs recast as bossa novas as well. The pianist has grown in confidence as a vocalist over the course of several CDs, developing a sexy yet never overdone style that beautifully complements the music. With her husband Marc Johnson (who has also been her longtime bassist of choice), drummer Paulo Braga, either Oscar Castro-Neves or Ricardo Vogt on acoustic guitar, and a pair of guests, Elias proves herself as a talented singing pianist, effortlessly switching between English and Portuguese lyrics."

Track listing

Personnel
 Eliane Elias – vocals and piano
 Oscar Castro Neves – guitar (except tracks 7 and 13)
 Ricardo Vogt – guitar (tracks 7, 13)
 Marc Johnson – bass
 Paulo Braga – drums and percussion
 Toots Thielmans – harmonica (tracks 6, 10)
 Ivan Lins – vocal (track 8)
 Rob Mathes – orchestra arranging and conducting (tracks 1, 3, 5, 6, 8, 9, 14)

Charts

Weekly charts

Year-end charts

References

2008 albums
Blue Note Records albums
Eliane Elias albums